Ciccotti is an Italian surname. Notable people with the surname include:

 Claudia Ciccotti (born 1994), Italian footballer
 Ettore Ciccotti (1863–1939), Italian historian, lecturer, and politician
 Giovanni Ciccotti (born 1943), Italian physicist

Italian-language surnames